The Dr. Jose N. Rodriguez Memorial Hospital (DJNRMH), formerly known as Central Luzon Sanitarium, was established in 1940, to accommodate patients with Hansen's Disease in the entire Luzon region in the Philippines. It is currently situated within the district of Tala, in Caloocan, Metro Manila, and occupies  of land area, from the original . The reduction of land area was to accommodate previous homeless treated patients who eventually settled and established their own community, called Tala.

In 1970, the hospital began treating general medical cases (non-Hansen disease patients) when there was a high success rate of treatment of the first Hansen patients from research and the advancement of procedures done within the current medical practice. Due to the significant drop of Hansen patients the hospital then considered admission of general cases.

The hospital currently serves as the principal referral hospital for leprosy patients and the premier training and research center for leprosy care and management in the Philippines. It also serves the public health needs of community members of Tala and nearby areas.

Services

- Public Health Unit

The hospital also conducts other services available for appropriate patients such as physical therapy, occupational therapy, radiology, laboratory, medical-social services and assistance.

The DJNRMH today
Today, DJNRMH envisions becoming a Tertiary General Hospital and a Center for Rehabilitation and care of leprosy patients. There is a pending House Bill No. 1395 in the Philippine Congress converting 200 beds of the 2,000 beds of DJNRMH for tertiary general health care. While awaiting approval of this bill, DJNRMH's 2,000 beds is now being utilized for custodial care (1,800 beds) and general care for non-leprosy cases (200 beds).

Affiliations and linkages
The former sanitarium serves and attends to patients together with other recognized Philippine non-government organizations (NGO) and including nearby religious organizations and Churches that send contributions and visit abandoned or dying patients for religious services and rites whenever applicable.

See also
 List of hospitals in Metro Manila

References

Hospital buildings completed in 1940
Hospitals in Metro Manila
Hospitals established in 1940
Buildings and structures in Caloocan
20th-century architecture in the Philippines